
Nisko County is a unit of territorial administration and local government (powiat) in Subcarpathian Voivodeship, south-eastern Poland. It came into being on January 1, 1999, as a result of the Polish local government reforms passed in 1998.

As of 2019 its total population is 66,699, out of which the population of Nisko is 15,324, that of Rudnik nad Sanem is 6,710, that of Ulanów is 1,422, and the rural population is 43,243.

Neighbouring counties
Nisko County is bordered by Janów Lubelski County to the north-east, Biłgoraj County to the east, Leżajsk County to the south-east, Rzeszów County to the south, Kolbuszowa County to the south-west and Stalowa Wola County to the north-west.

Administrative division
The county is subdivided into seven gminas (three urban-rural and four rural). These are listed in the following table, in descending order of population.

References

 
Nisko